Snow is the sixth studio album of the progressive rock band Spock's Beard, and the final album with main songwriter and vocalist Neal Morse, who left immediately after the release of the album due to his conversion to Christianity. It was released in 2002 on Radiant Records.

A concept album, Snow follows the story of "Snow", a 17 year old albino with mystical healing powers who goes on a journey through ego and unrequited love and is ultimately redeemed by spirituality in the end.

Background and recording
Neal Morse began recording Snow in summer of 2001, when he flew from Tennessee to Los Angeles, California. Upon arrival, he wasn't satisfied with his recording of the album, and decided to re-write it, in order to create a decent concept piece. For that, he needed to fly back. He then returned with an almost completely rewritten version, which Dave Meros was surprised by, because he awaited the revised version. The group then completed recording it overnight, on September 10, 2001. The next day, Spock's Beard was scheduled to fly back to Tennessee, but due to the September 11 attacks, ended up stranded in the airport.

Spock's Beard decided to rent a car so they could get safely home. During that time, while the group listened to Bob Dylan and God Bless America (which was sung by Congress over the radio), Neal Morse got an idea for the album's concept. It will become a mysterious Albino psychic and healer. Upon returning to Tennessee, Neal spent months polishing the concept and writing more songs, but upon returning to LA, he suffered an emotional wreck, and decided to quit the band, the announcement of which came nine months after the first recording of the album. He told his band members that he was a devoted Christian, and viewed the songs "Open Wide the Flood Gates," "Love Beyond Words," and Wind at My Back" as prayers. He then had a hard time deciding whether to go with the band's ideology, or create his own solo album, with a focus on Christianity as its base. After the recording was complete, Neal said his farewells to the former band. Due to Neal's departure, the Snow tour was cancelled.

Neal Morse and Nick D'Virgilio returned to the band in 2016 for the Snow Live concert at Morsefest in Nashville, Tennessee. Snow Live was also performed once more in 2016 at the Night of the Prog festival in Loreley, Germany.

Live Release
On November 10, 2017, Spock's Beard released a live Blu-ray DVD version of the album via Metal Blade and Radiant Records. The DVD version contains both parts of the album, as well as encores "June" and "Falling for Forever", and behind the scenes featurette "The Making of Snow Live".

Track listing
All songs written by Neal Morse except where noted.

Disc one

Disc two

Disc three
The Special Limited Edition of this album contains a third disc, made of acoustic tracks, work-in-progress and a cover ("South Side of the Sky", originally on the Yes album Fragile)
"South Side of the Sky" (Jon Anderson, Chris Squire) – 9:11
"The Good Don't Last/Open Wide the Flood Gates" (Live acoustic) – 11:26
"Working on 'Devil/Fiddly/Disco" – 4:41
"Looking for Answers" (Live acoustic) – 4:59
"Stranger in a Strange Land (Demo)" – 2:34 	
"4 O'Clock" – 0:24
"Working on Ryo's Solo" – 7:42
"Lost Bass Solo" – 2:01
"The Light" (Live acoustic) – 6:08
"Working on I Will Go" – 2:10

Personnel
Neal Morse – lead vocals, piano, synths, acoustic guitar
Alan Morse – electric guitars, vocals, cello
Ryo Okumoto – hammond organ, mellotron, jupiter 8, minimoog, vocoder
Dave Meros – bass, vocals, French horn
Nick D'Virgilio – drums, percussion, vocals, lead vocals on "Carie" and "Looking for Answers"

Production
Chris Carmichael – violin, viola, cello
Jim Hoke – saxophone, clarinet, autoharp
Neil Rosengarden – flugelhorn, trumpet
Molly Pasutti – backing vocals on "Open the Gates Part 2"
 Rich Mouser - mixing

See also
Snow was unofficially adapted into a live musical, Snow: the Modern Opera, and performed in 2012 by a small theater group in New Hampshire.

References

External links
Official website
Plot description from Official Spock's beard Website
InsideOut Music

2002 albums
Concept albums
Spock's Beard albums
Rock operas
Inside Out Music albums